Turah is an unincorporated community located in the eastern half of Missoula County, Montana, United States along Interstate 90. It has a population of 306 as of 2010 census.

Demographics

References

Unincorporated communities in Missoula County, Montana
Unincorporated communities in Montana